was a Japanese mathematician who for over three decades was on the faculty at Johns Hopkins University. He is known for his contributions to algebraic geometry and number theory. The Igusa zeta-function, the Igusa quartic, Igusa subgroups, Igusa curves, and Igusa varieties are named after him.

He was an invited speaker for the 1962 International Congress of Mathematicians in Stockholm. He was awarded Japan's Order of the Sacred Treasure. In 2012 he became a fellow of the American Mathematical Society.

Life and career
Igusa was born in Kiyosato village, Gunma Prefecture, Japan, on 30 January 1924. He graduated from the University of Tokyo in 1945 and received his Ph.D. from Kyoto University in 1953, after which he became professor of mathematics at the University of Tsukuba. After a brief period spent at Harvard University, he took up a permanent position at Johns Hopkins University, in Baltimore. Igusa taught at Johns Hopkins from 1955 to 1993. He joined the staff of the American Journal of Mathematics as an associate editor in 1964, and served as chief editor between 1978 and 1993. Igusa died, aged 89, of a stroke at Holly Hill Nursing Home in Towson, Maryland, on 24 November 2013.

He had three sons, Kiyoshi, Takeru and Mitsuru. Takeru Igusa is a professor of civil engineering at Johns Hopkins University. Kiyoshi Igusa is a professor of mathematics at Brandeis University.

Publications

References

1924 births
2013 deaths
20th-century Japanese mathematicians
21st-century Japanese mathematicians
Kyoto University alumni
Johns Hopkins University faculty
Fellows of the American Mathematical Society
Japanese expatriates in the United States
Academic journal editors
Recipients of the Order of the Sacred Treasure, 3rd class
University of Tokyo alumni
People from Gunma Prefecture
Academic staff of the University of Tsukuba
Harvard University faculty